An on-again, off-again relationship (also known as an on–off or off–on relationship) is a form of personal relationship between two persons who keep breaking up only to reconcile afterwards, thus repeating a cycle.

Researcher Kale Monk, an assistant professor of human development and family sciences at the University of Missouri, cites several reasons as to why a relationship might be on-again, off-again, including one partner relocating to a new place or the couple re-assessing their relationship. Many continue to reunite out of a persistent hope that the moments of happiness and gratification they have known will eventually constitute the entire relationship.

Being in an on-again, off-again relationship can damage one's mental health, leading to possible depression, eating disorder, and/or anxiety. Additionally, Monk also notes how these types of relationships have higher rates of abuse, poorer communication, and lower levels of commitment. Not all on-again, off-again relationships are considered toxic, as breaking up and reconciling can help a couple with better communication and address the issues in their relationships.

A 2009 study published in the Personal Relationships journal revealed that nearly two-thirds of participants have experienced being in an on-again, off-again relationship.

References 

Intimate relationships
Interpersonal relationships
Interpersonal conflict
Relationship breakup